The Balu River, located in Bangladesh, is a tributary of the Shitalakshya River. It passes through the wetlands of Beel Belai and Dhaka before its confluence with the Shitalakshya at Demra.

References

Rivers of Bangladesh
Rivers of Dhaka Division